Coonoor railway station serves Coonoor, a municipality town and popular hill station in the Nilgiris district of Tamil Nadu. The train station is a part of the Nilgiri Mountain Railway, a World Heritage Site. The train station is an important rail hub for trains passing to Udhagamandalam (Ooty). It is administered by the Salem division of the Southern Railway Zone and the station code is: ONR.

Trains

See also 
 
 Nilgiri Mountain Railway

References

Railway stations in Nilgiris district
Railway stations opened in 1908
Coonoor
1908 establishments in India
Mountain railways in India